Musick  is an unincorporated community in Mingo County, West Virginia, United States.

References 

Unincorporated communities in West Virginia
Unincorporated communities in Mingo County, West Virginia